The 2000 North Queensland Cowboys season was the 6th in the club's history. Coached by Tim Sheens and captained by new signing Tim Brasher, they competed in the National Rugby League's 2000 Telstra Premiership, finishing in last place.

Season summary 
The Cowboys entered the new millennium with a renewed sense of hope, adding veterans Tim Brasher and Julian O'Neill from the South Sydney Rabbitohs, with Brasher becoming the club's fifth captain.

The competition started a month earlier due to the Sydney Olympics being held later that year. Because of this, the side played their first month away from home. It was a disastrous away trip, with the club losing their first three games. They managed a win on their final away game against Parramatta but were later stripped of the two competition points after fielding a fourteenth player for three minutes.

After two straight losses, back-to-back wins followed, which included the club's biggest ever victory at the time, a 50-10 win over the Northern Eagles. It was the first time the club had scored 50 points in a game. Five rounds later they recorded 50 points again, breaking their biggest winning margin record with a 50-4 victory over St George Illawarra. It would be one of the last bright spots of the season, as the club managed just two wins from the final 13 rounds and ended the season in last place.

Paul Green represented Queensland in State of Origin once again, and was joined by O'Neill and Paul Bowman, who made his first appearance for the Maroons. Brasher was selected for New South Wales, becoming the club's first Blues' representative.

Despite playing State of Origin, Green was sacked halfway through the season for allegedly negotiating with other clubs while still under contract. He would subsequently win an out-of-court settlement against the club. In a further blow to the club, homegrown halfback Scott Prince, who made his debut at 18 and played 53 games for the side, departed at the end of the season for rivals, the Brisbane Broncos.

Milestones 
 Round 1: Tim Brasher, Glenn Morrison, Jason Nicol, Julian O'Neill and Robert Relf made their debuts for the club.
 Round 1: Nathan Fien made his NRL debut.
 Round 3: Graham Appo made his debut for the club.
 Round 4: Jeremy Schloss made his debut for the club.
 Round 5: Paul Bowman played his 50th game for the club.
 Round 6: Martin Locke played his 50th game for the club.
 Round 7: Des Clark made his debut for the club.
 Round 11: John Buttigieg played his 50th game for the club.
 Round 12: Grant Reibel made his NRL debut.
 Round 16: Shane Kenward made his debut for the club.
 Round 16: Naipolioni Kuricibi made his NRL debut.
 Round 18: Jamie McDonald made his debut for the club.
 Round 18: Daniel Strickland made his NRL debut.
 Round 23: Scott Prince played his 50th game for the club.
 Round 25: Bruce Mamando made his debut for the club.

Squad List

Squad Movement

2000 Gains

2000 Losses

Ladder

Fixtures

Regular season

Statistics 

Source:

Representatives 
The following players played a representative match in 2000.

Honours

Club 
 Player(s) of the Year: Paul Bowman and Julian O'Neill
 Players' Player: Tim Brasher
 Club Person of the Year: Cowboys' Supporters Team

Feeder Clubs

NSWRL First Division 
  North Queensland Cowboys - Unknown

References 

North Queensland Cowboys seasons
North Queensland Cowboys